The March of the Defenders of Moscow or the Song of the Defenders of Moscow is a Russian military march originally used by the Red Army and appeared first during the 1941 Battle of Moscow. The words to the march were written by Alexey Surkov while the music was composed by Boris Mokrousov. In early October 1941, the Wehrmacht began their offensive to take control of Moscow. In shock, Surkov composed a poem he titled Defenders of Moscow. The poems were first published in the newspaper of the Krasnoarmeiskaya Pravda on 3 November 1941. A week later, it was printed by Vechernyaya Moskva. Drawing the attention of the Central Studio of Documentary Film of USSR, the text was set to music by Mokrousov and was broadcast in a documentary on the defense of the cities of Volokolamsk and Mozhaysk. It was later performed in an orchestra setting in the 1942 Soviet film, Moscow Strikes Back. It was also used in the 1944 film Six P.M..
 

The song is part of the traditional repertoire of many Russian military bands and is one of many composed during the Great Patriotic War (known in Europe as the Second World War). Today, it is frequently performed during the annual Victory Day Parade (performed as recently as 2005 and 2010) of the Moscow Garrison. The melody to the march was taken again to be that of the hymn of the Turkish Communist Party.

Lyrics
The march is composed of four verses and a chorus which is as follows:

References 

1941 songs
Choral compositions
Russian patriotic songs
Russian military marches